The Church of Jesus Christ of Latter-day Saints in Ivory Coast refers to the Church of Jesus Christ of Latter-day Saints (LDS Church) and its members in Ivory Coast.  At year-end 1989, there were fewer than 200 members in Ivory Coast. In 2021, there were 56,804 members in 257 congregations.

History

Mormon missionaries first preached in Ivory Coast in 1988. Earlier the Church of Jesus Christ of Latter-day Saints had been established by Philippe and Annelies Assard and Lucien and Agathe Affoue.  The Affoue family joined the church while studying in France. Philippe Assard joined the Church while studying in Germany, where he married Annelies who was a native of Germany. After they returned to Ivroy Coast in the mid 1980s they got in contact with each other and began holding Church meetings.

The first LDS stake was organized in the late 1990s. During the civil war in the 2000s the number of missionaries in the country was reduced and some areas saw missionaries withdrawn. As of 2018 most full-time LDS missionaries in the country were from either the Congo or countries in West Africa, but there were a very few from other areas.

Plans to build a temple of The Church of Jesus Christ of Latter-day Saints in Abidjan were announced in 2015. As of 2018 the country had three LDS missions, although two of them also covered Church operations in Senegal and Mali.

Missions

In November 2022, the LDS Church announced it will be crating the Côte d'Ivoire Abidjan North Mission in July 2023 by dividing the east mission and adjoining portions of the west mission.

Guinea
The Conakry Branch was created on June 18, 2017. Initially it became part of the Sierra Leone Freetown Mission but later came under the Côte d'Ivoire Yamoussoukro Mission. The LDS church reported 61 members in 2018.

Mali
Mali has a single congregation, the Bamako Branch, which was created on July 9, 2017. The LDS Church was granted official status in January 2019. The LDS Church reported 50 Latter-day Saint families in Mali that same year and recognition allows missionaries in the country. The branch is administered by the Cote d'Ivoire Abidjan East Mission as of February 2023, and membership was estimated to be 100 in 2021.

Senegal
In 2016, the first missionaries, humanitarian service missionaries, arrived in Senegal, and on February 20, 2018, the LDS Church received official recognition from the Government.
On February 13, 2022, the Dakar Senegal District was created with three branches in the Dakar Area (Dakar, Ouakam, Parcelles) as well as a branch in Saint-Louis. There was 108 members in Senegal in 2018 and is assigned to the Côte d'Ivoire Abidjan West Mission.

The Gambia
On February 23, 2022, Elder D. Todd Christofferson along with other Church leaders dedicated the Gambia for the Church's preaching.  On June 10, 2022, the Banjul Branch was created. The branch at that time consisted of 26 members and two full-time missionaries from the Cote d'Ivoire Abidjan West Mission.

Temples

Plans to build a temple of The Church of Jesus Christ of Latter-day Saints in Abidjan were announced in 2015. On Nov. 8, 2018 Elder Neil L. Andersen of the Quorum of the 12 of The Church of Jesus Christ of Latter-day Saints presided at the ground breaking for the Abidjan Ivory Coast Temple. Andersen both spoke and gave the dedicatory prayer in French. During his remarks Anderson shared testimonies of the restored gospel from the Assard family.

See also

 Christianity in Ivory Coast

References

External links
 Newsroom (Côte d'Ivoire) Facts and Statistics
 The Church of Jesus Christ of Latter-day Saints Official Site
 ComeUntoChrist.org Visitors Site

Churches in Ivory Coast
The Church of Jesus Christ of Latter-day Saints in Africa
1988 establishments in Ivory Coast